The Commemoration of Atatürk, Youth and Sports Day , is an annual Turkish national holiday celebrated on May 19 to commemorate Mustafa Kemal's landing at Samsun on May 19, 1919, which is regarded as the beginning of the Turkish War of Independence in the official historiography.

History

Gymnastics Festival

The first "Gymnastics Festival" (İdman Bayramı) was held at the sport meadow of Kadıköy İttihad Sports (Union Club until 1915) by Erkek Muallim Mektebi (Teachers' College for Boys) with personal enterprise of Selim Sirri Bey (Tarcan), who was the Inspector of the Ministry of Education of the Ottoman Empire at the time. According to some sources, it was held on May 12, 1916, as to Faik Reşit Unat, in May 1916, as to Selim Sırrı Tarcan himself, on April 29, 1916. Selim Sirri Bey had brought a score of the Swedish folk music titled Tre trallande jäntor ("Three carolling girls") and collected by Felix Körling. This folk music became "Dağ Başını Duman Almış" marşı with Turkish lyrics written by Ali Ulvi Bey (Elöve) in 1917 and sung in this festival for the first time.

Mustafa Kemal's landing in Samsun
Fahrî Yâver-i Hazret-i Şehriyâri Mirliva Mustafa Kemal Pasha was assigned as the inspector of the Ninth Army Troops Inspectorate on April 30, 1919, tasked to oversee the disbanding the Ottoman Army required by the Treaty of Sèvres, and left Istanbul with his staff aboard steamer SS Bandırma for Samsun. After landing in Samsun on May 19, Mustafa Kemal started the Turkish National Movement in contravention to his orders, an act that would lead to the Turkish War of Independence and ultimately the proclamation of the Republic of Turkey in 1923.

Mustafa Kemal and his staff left Samsun on May 24 for transferring their headquarters to the village of Karageçmiş in Havza district. According to Hamza Eroğlu, they sang the march Dağ Başını Duman Almış while marching from Samsun to Havza, and according to Şevket Süreyya Aydemir, they also sang this song after leaving Havza to go to Amasya.

Atatürk's later years
According to İsmet Bozdağ, his best friend Şükrü Kaya, who was the Minister of the Interior at the time, told him that:

On May 19, 1936, Mustafa Kemal Atatürk made a conversation with his close friends Şükrü Kaya, Ruşen Eşref Ünaydın, Kılıç Ali, Salih Bozok, Mehmet Seydan and Nuri Conker at the Dolmabahçe Palace in Istanbul. Atatürk asked them "Do you know what today is?" They replied, "the third day of the occupation of Izmir", "Ankara meeting", "Ismet Pasha telegraphed from Lausanne", "Golden Horn Conference", "Turco-British negotiations over Iraq", "Progressive Republican Party was banned" ... even Atatürk's close friends couldn't remember Mustafa Kemal's landing in Samsun.

Atatürk then said "It is a day about the liberation of our country." Still, his friends couldn't identify the correct event. Some time later, Şükrü Kaya said "Was this the day when you left Istanbul?", and Atatürk replied "You came closer... It was the day that we landed in Samsun." Atatürk went on to say "This day will be a festival that we'll celebrate." Next year, "May 19" was celebrated with Şükrü Kaya's arrangement.

Until then, "May 19" was not given any special meaning, besides Atatürk's expression "Gentlemen, I landed in Samsun on the nineteenth day of May of the year 1919" in his book, Nutuk.

With the Law No. 3466 dated June 20, 1938, "May 19" was officialized as the Festival of Youth and Sports. The march Dağ Başını Duman Almış was announced as the Gençlik ve Spor Bayramı Marşı (March of the Festival of Youth and Sports, popularly known as the Gençlik Marşı).

Practice
Youths sing the national anthem, visit Anıtkabir, recite poems, make parades and sports and realise cultural activities like performing folk dances and play epic drama to commemorate Atatürk and his companions' beginning of the national struggle in 1919 that would lead to the establishment of the Republic of Turkey, in 1923.

The Turkish Republic of Northern Cyprus also commemorates this day as a national holiday.

Atatürk's birthday 
Atatürk was born in 1881. But his birth date is not known. In one of his speeches, he declared that he considers his birthday as May 19, in clear reference to the beginning of the national struggle in 1919.

Media

See also
 Youth Day in other countries
 Public holidays in Turkey

Footnotes

Sources

External links

 http://www.paragrapher.net/19-mayis-ataturku-anma-genclik-ve-spor-bayrami
"Turkey celebrates May 19th Youth & Sports Day", World Bulletin Tuesday, 19 May 2009 10:16
Turgay Tuna, "Dağ Başını Duman Almış"lı Günlerden Cumhuriyetimizin 81. Yıldönümündeki Genç Kızlarımıza..., Kimlik, Sayı: 8, October 2004. 
19 mayıs: Ata'nın 'Doğum günüm' dediği tarih..., Ortadoğu, May 19, 2010. 

Public holidays in Turkey
Remembrance days
Mustafa Kemal Atatürk
May observances
Youth in Turkey
Annual events in Turkey
Youth festivals
Spring (season) events in Turkey